Pimelea rosea, commonly known as Rose Banjine, is a species of small shrub of the family Thymelaeaceae. It is native to Australia and is found mostly along the southwestern coast. It is not considered threatened.

Description
Pimelea rosea is a shrub with an erect habit. It grows to between 0.3 and 1 m tall. Its flowers are pink, red or purple, and bloom from July to December. It is usually found on coastal sand dunes and the surrounding areas.

References

rosea